Abuta is a genus in the flowering plant family Menispermaceae, of about 32 species, native to tropical Central and South America.

Description
It consists in dioecious climbers or rarely erect trees or shrubs (Abuta concolor) with simple leaves. Flowers in composed panicles. Male flowers: sepals 6, in 2 whorls, petals absent, stamens 6, connate or free, introrse, anthers with a longitudinal or transverse dehiscence. Female flowers: sepals and petals as in male, staminodes 6, carpels 3, drupes ovoid, endocarp woody, condyle septiform, endosperm ruminate, embryo curved, cotyledons appressed. It is in the tropical rain forest.

Taxonomy
Abuta is usually classified in the tribe Anomospermeae Miers, together with Anomospermum Miers.

Synonymy
The genera Anelasma Miers and Batschia Thunb. have been brought into synonymy with Abuta.

Uses
Abuta is one of the components of the arrow poison curare of some indigenous tribes of South America (especially Abuta imene from Colombia). Roots of Abuta rufescens are used as medicinal in diseases of the urogenital tract, but it is dangerous.

The dichloromethane extracts of Abuta grandifolia and Minthostachys setosa (Labiatae) demonstrated high larvicidal activity against Aedes aegypti, the most active being the dichloromethane extract of A. grandifolia.

Selected species
Abuta acutifolia Miers
Abuta amara Aubl.
Abuta antioquiana Krukoff & Barneby
Abuta aristeguietae Krukoff & Barneby
Abuta barbata Miers
Abuta boliviana Rusby
Abuta brevifolia Krukoff & Moldenke
Abuta brunnescens Krukoff & Barneby
Abuta bullata Moldenke
Abuta candicans Rich. ex DC.
Abuta candollei Triana & Planch.
Abuta chiapasensis Krukoff & Barneby
Abuta chocoensis Krukoff & Barneby
Abuta colombiana Moldenke
Abuta concolor Poepp. & Endl.
Abuta convexa Diels
Abuta duckei Diels
Abuta dwyerana Krukoff & Barneby
Abuta ecuadoriensis Moldenke
Abuta fluminum Krukoff & Barneby
Abuta froesii Krukoff & Moldenke
Abuta grandifolia (Mart.) Sandwith
Abuta grisebachii Triana & Planch.
Abuta guianensis Eichler
Abuta heterophylla Miers
Abuta imene Eichler
Abuta klugii Moldenke ex Macbride
Abuta limaciifolia Diels
Abuta longa Krukoff & Barneby
Abuta macrocarpa Moldenke
Abuta macrophylla Miers
Abuta manausensis Krukoff & Barneby
Abuta mycetandra Krukoff & Barneby
Abuta negroensis Krukoff & Moldenke
Abuta oblonga Miers
Abuta oblongifolia Miers
Abuta obovata Diels
Abuta pahni Krukoff & Barneby
Abuta panamensis (Standl.) Krukoff & Barneby
Abuta panurensis Eichler
Abuta parvifolia Rusby ex Moldenke
Abuta platyphylla Mart. ex Eichler
Abuta pullei Diels
Abuta racemosa Triana & Planch.
Abuta rufescens Aubl. *
Abuta sadwithiana Krukoff & Barneby
Abuta scandens DC.
Abuta seemanni Triana & Planch.
Abuta selloana Eichler
Abuta solimoesensis Krukoff & Barneby
Abuta soukupi Moldenke
Abuta spicata Triana & Planch.
Abuta splendida Krukoff & Moldenke
Abuta steyermarkii (Standl.) Standl.
Abuta tomentosa Sagot ex Benth.
Abuta toxifera Baill. ex Krukoff & Moldenke
Abuta trinervis (Rusby) Moldenke 
Abuta umbellata Sagot ex Benth.
Abuta vaupesensis Krukoff & Barneby
Abuta velutina Gleason
Abuta verruculosa Krukoff & Barneby
Abuta wilson-brownei R.S.Cowan

See also
 List of Abuta species

References

Further reading
 [monographic revision of the genus]
 [taxonomic partial revision]

External links
Images of Abuta panamensis from La Flora Digital de La Selva, Costa Rica

Menispermaceae genera
Neotropical realm flora
Menispermaceae
Taxa named by Jean Baptiste Christian Fusée-Aublet